Prince Iancu Racoviță (1843–1865) was a nobleman from Wallachia, who participated in a notable duel on 28. August 1864. He had come from Romania to Berlin in 1856, where he studied philosophy and law at Berlin university. He became a member of a German Student Corps there.

A diplomat in Bavarian service, Wilhelm von Dönniges (d. 1872), father of Helene von Dönniges (b. 1846, d. 1911) intended the prince to marry his daughter. She preferred a Social Democratic leader of the labour movement, Ferdinand Lassalle, known for his independence from persons such as Karl Marx. When her father heard of their plans to marry he locked her in a room and arranged an engagement with Racoviță. Lassalle challenged Helene's father. When the count heard of this, he took over Lassalle's challenge - this was a common duelling procedure, when an older man was challenged by a younger one. Lassalle had no experience in the use of pistols and only one day to exercise. Shot in the groin, Lassalle died in this pistol duel in Switzerland.  Following the duel Racoviţă fell ill and died not long after Helene von Dönniges married him. His widow married a second time an actor named Friedmann and became an actress herself. This marriage ended in divorce in 1873. Together with her third husband, the Russian nobleman Sergej Jegorowitsch Schewitsch she then moved to America but returned to Europe 1890.

References

External links 
sahistory.org
Dictionary of Political Figures

1843 births
1865 deaths
Wallachian nobility
19th-century diplomats
Romanian duellists